Henri Franciscus "Huug" de Groot (7 May 1890 – 18 April 1957) was a Dutch amateur football (soccer) player who competed in the 1912 Summer Olympics.

He was part of the Dutch team, which won the bronze medal in the football tournament. In 1913 he scored both goals in the Netherlands' first ever victory over England.

From 1908 to 1917, he played for Sparta Rotterdam.

References

External links
 
 

1890 births
1957 deaths
Dutch footballers
Footballers at the 1912 Summer Olympics
Olympic footballers of the Netherlands
Olympic bronze medalists for the Netherlands
Footballers from Rotterdam
Olympic medalists in football
Sparta Rotterdam players
Medalists at the 1912 Summer Olympics
Association football forwards
Netherlands international footballers